Caccobius schreberi is a species of Scarabaeidae or scarab beetles in the superfamily Scarabaeoidea.

Description
Head and pronotum are black. Pronotum is almost circular, as wide as the elytrae, and densely punctured. Elytrae have distinct black marks and two pairs of reddish spots. The first pair of legs are powerful, with three teeth on the outside and fit to digging.

Distribution
This species is present in most of Europe, in the Middle East and in North Africa. These beetles can be found in dry steppe areas.

Bibliography
 Fiori A. (1903) Caccobius Schreberi Lin. E sue varietà, Rivista coleotterologica italiana. Camerino 1(6):105-109
 Mulsant E. (1842) Histoire naturelle des Coléoptères de France. Lamellicornes, Paris, Lyon :1-623
 Linnaeus C. (1767) Systema naturae per regna tria naturae, secundum classes, ordines, genera, species cum characteribus, differentiis, synonymis, locis. Editio XII, Laurentii Salvi, Holmiae 1:1-1327
  Scarabs: World Scarabaeidae Database. Schoolmeesters P.

References

External links
 Società Entomologica Italiana
 INPN

Scarabaeidae
Beetles described in 1767
Taxa named by Carl Linnaeus